Tri-Center High School is a rural public high school near Neola, Iowa. It is part of the Tri-Center Community School District.  The school was established in 1962. The school's mascot is the Trojan and the school's colors are yellow and black.

General
Tri-Center is a member of the Western Iowa Conference in all of their sports. There are over 100 staff members educating 800 students each school year in K through 12th grade from Neola, Minden, Persia, Beebeetown, and the surrounding areas. Tri-Center is a 7-A school.

Technology
Tri-Center features a fully networked campus that is equipped with telecommunications, internet, projection systems, and satellite capabilities in each classroom. A fiber optics room for long-distance learning is also available, as well as three traditional 24-station computer labs. In addition to this, a 20-station terminal services lab has been established in the M.S./H.S. library/media center to enhance the reading and research process, and 12 wireless mobile PC laptops labs (each filled with laptops), have been incorporated in the elementary, middle, and high schools to assist with student learning, internet usage, and the implementation of the Accelerated Reader and Accelerated Math Programs.

Sports
The Trojans compete in the Western Iowa Conference in the following sports:

 Basketball
 Football 
 Baseball 
 1987 Class 2A State Champions 
 Basketball
 Volleyball
 Wrestling 
 Soccer
 Bowling
 Cross Country
 Track and Field
 Boys' 2001 Class 2A State Champions
 Girls' 2004 Class 1A State Champions
 Softball 
 Golf

See also
List of high schools in Iowa

References

Public high schools in Iowa
Schools in Pottawattamie County, Iowa
Private middle schools in Iowa
Educational institutions established in 1962
1962 establishments in Iowa